The 2015 North Texas Mean Green football team represented the University of North Texas as a member of the West Division of Conference USA diring the 2015 NCAA Division I FBS football season  They began the season with Dan McCarney as head coach, in his fifth season, and played their home games at Apogee Stadium in Denton, Texas.

On October 10, McCarney was fired after a 66–7 blowout loss to Portland State, with offensive coordinator Mike Canales named interim head coach for the remainder of the season. They finished the season 1–11 (1–7 in C-USA play) to place last in the West Division.

Schedule
North Texas announced their 2015 football schedule on February 2, 2015. The 2015 schedule consist of five home and seven away games in the regular season. The Mean Green will host CUSA foes Rice, UTEP, UTSA, and Western Kentucky (WKU), and will travel to Louisiana Tech, Marshall, Middle Tennessee, and Southern Miss.

Game summaries

SMU

Rice

Iowa

Southern Miss

Portland State

Following the 66–7 loss to FCS Portland State, Mean Green head coach Dan McCarney was fired. The 59-point margin is the biggest FCS win over an FBS team since Division I football was divided into the groupings now known as FCS and FBS in 1978.

WKU

Marshall

UTSA

Louisiana Tech

Tennessee

Middle Tennessee

UTEP

References

North Texas
North Texas Mean Green football seasons
North Texas Mean Green football